"Whiskey River" is a song co-written and recorded by American country music singer Johnny Bush.  It was a hit for both Bush and his friend Willie Nelson.

Johnny Bush version
Bush released the song in 1972 through RCA Victor and included it on his album Whiskey River. Bush later re-recorded the song in 1981 and released it through the Delta label, with "When My Conscience Hurts the Most" on the b-side.

Willie Nelson versions
Willie Nelson first recorded "Whiskey River" for the album Shotgun Willie in 1973. In 1978, a recording from Nelson's live album Willie and Family Live was released as a single through Columbia Records. "Whiskey River", despite not being a Nelson original, has come to be regarded as one of his signature songs and a concert staple.

Nelson performed the song during the pilot episode of the long-running music television series Austin City Limits—marking the first song to be performed on the program.

Chart performance

Johnny Bush

ARe-recording.

Willie Nelson

In popular culture
Willie Nelson's version of the song is featured in Rockstar Games' Grand Theft Auto V game soundtrack

References

1972 singles
1978 singles
1981 singles
Willie Nelson songs
Johnny Bush songs
RCA Victor singles
Columbia Records singles
Songs about alcohol
1972 songs